Clay Hill, also spelled Clayhill, is an unincorporated community in Marengo County, Alabama, United States. Clay Hill was established prior to the American Civil War. It had a post office at one time, but it no longer exists.

Geography

References

Unincorporated communities in Alabama
Unincorporated communities in Marengo County, Alabama